CKTB is a radio station in St. Catharines, Ontario, Canada. Broadcasting at 610 AM, the station airs a news/talk format. CKTB is housed in the former mansion of William Hamilton Merritt, the main promoter of the first Welland Canal, located on Yates Street in downtown St. Catharines. Its transmitters are located on Grassy Brook Road east of Port Robinson.

CKTB was launched in 1930 by Edward T. Sandell at 1120 on the AM dial, as a phantom station of CKOC in Hamilton. As with most early AM radio stations (see Canadian allocations changes under NARBA), the station changed frequencies a number of times in its early years, moving to 1200 in 1933, 1230 in 1941, 1550 in 1946, 620 in 1950 and its current 610 in 1959.

In 1936, the station became a founding affiliate of CBC Radio and in 1944, affiliated with CBC's Dominion Network. The affiliation remained until the Dominion Network was dissolved in 1962.

Sandell died in 1943, and the station was acquired by Niagara District Broadcasting the following year. Niagara District Broadcasting subsequently launched CKTB-FM in 1949.

The stations were acquired by Standard Broadcasting in 1980. Standard sold CKTB to Affinity Radio Group in 1997. Affinity was in turn acquired by Telemedia in 2000; Standard reacquired the station when it purchased Telemedia in 2002.

In October 2007, Astral Media acquired Standard Broadcasting's terrestrial radio and television assets, including CKTB.

Ownership changed hands again in July 2013 when most of Astral Media's broadcasting properties including CKTB were sold to Bell Media, a subsidiary of Bell Canada.

Programming
CKTB's programming is a mixture of locally produced Canadian programming and American syndicated programs, owing to St. Catharines's position halfway between the cities of Hamilton, Ontario and Buffalo, New York.

As of February 2020, local weekday hosts include Tim Denis, Shelby Knox and Tom McConnell. Weekend local programming consists of a morning show hosted by married hosts Carol and Paul Mott which is syndicated on 610 AM and 1010 CFRB. Past hosts of locally produced programming include Joe Cahill, Kevin Jack, Stephanie Sabourin, Rob McConnell, Larry Fedoruk, Chris Biggs and John Michael.

CKTB was the only affiliate in Canada to carry the controversial The Phil Hendrie Show until 2006, when Phil Hendrie retired for the first time. CKTB continued to air the best of Phil Hendrie on Saturdays from 6-10p.m. until April 2007. At that point, the show was replaced with other programming. With Hendrie's return to radio, however, CKTB returned him to the lineup on a daily basis. The show, however, was subsequently dropped and replaced by Joy Browne, another American show. Browne's program was also subsequently dropped in favour of two-hour-long 'best of' programming blocks, edited from the day's local programming.

While St. Catharines is usually considered a part of the Buffalo market when dealing with syndicated programming, CKTB does not usually show up in Buffalo's Arbitron ratings. A lack of knowledge of the station, its distance from Buffalo (coupled with its presence on the AM dial), and its primarily Canadian content during the day contribute to this. However, BBM registers CKTB as a popular station in the St. Catharines market, with audience share comparable to that of CHML's audience share in nearby Hamilton.

References

External links
 Newstalk 610 CKTB
 CKTB history - Canadian Communications Foundation
 

Ktb
Ktb
Ktb
Radio stations established in 1930
1930 establishments in Ontario
KTB